Zavoleh-ye Sofla (also Romanized as Zāvoleh-ye Soflá; also known as Zavaleh, Zāvoleh, and Zāvoleh-ye Pā’īn) is a village in Qalkhani Rural District, Gahvareh District, Dalahu County, Kermanshah Province, Iran. At the 2006 census, its population was 146, in 29 families.

References 

Populated places in Dalahu County